Chehalis–Centralia Airport  is a city-owned public use airport located in Chehalis, a city in Lewis County, Washington. The airport lies one mile (1.6 km) west of the town.

History

The area was first served by an airport during the early 1900s on the Borst family homestead located near the Skookumchuck River and present-day Fort Borst Park in Centralia.

Chehalis–Centralia Airport began in 1927, when the Donahoe family sold Lewis County part of their  farm. Later that year, the plot was split, and dedicated  as an airstrip, and the rest to a golf course. In 1928, the county purchased an additional  to expand the airfield. By World War II, the airport covered , and became known as a city-county airport. During WWII, the federal government seized the airport, using it as a training facility for new pilots, and also developed two 5,000 foot (1,524 m) runways. By 1960, the airport was given to its current owner, the city of Chehalis.

During severe flooding due to the Great Coastal Gale of 2007, the World War II levee pump, built in 1942, failed, forcing an intentional break of the levee and increased damages to the community. A modern, electric two-pump station was built in 2017 with funding provided by the Chehalis River Basin Authority at a cost of $1.14 million.

In 2020, the airport was granted a loan thru the Washington State Department of Transportation (WSDOT), with an estimated completion cost of $1.48 million, to construct two 12,000 gallon above-ground fuel storage tanks, with additional requirements towards environmental hazard mitigation, emergency preparedness, contamination control, and "cultural resource monitoring".

The Aviation Division of WSDOT chose Chehalis–Centralia Airport in 2021 as one of six beta-test sites in Washington state to be used as an airfield for electric aircraft. The same year, the airport was awarded $59,000 thru the Airport Rescue Grant via the American Rescue Plan Act of 2021 due to Covid-19 pandemic economic hardships.

Facilities and aircraft

(1,524 x 42.67 m) For the 12-month period ending June 30, 2011, the airport had 47,710 total operations, an average of 131 per day: 90% general aviation, 9% air taxi, and <1% military. There are 105 aircraft based at this airport: 81% single-engine, 5% multi-engine, 3% jet, 8% helicopter, 2% ultralight, and 2% glider.

Surrounded by a levee built by the United States Army Corps of Engineers, the airport also contains a endorheic lake aptly named Airport Lake at the northeast portion of the field.

Commercial service

, the Chehalis–Centralia Airport is not served by a commercial airline, however, West Coast Airlines previously operated scheduled flights to Chehalis. Flights began after World War II and ceased by 1958.

Training and flight programs

The Lewis County Civil Air Patrol is stationed at the airport. Providing limited free instruction to people as young as 12 years old, the program offers a flight academy with a possibility to earn a pilot's license.

An annual event that coincides with the city's ChehalisFest celebration, the airport hosts free flights for children and teenagers. Referred to as "Young Eagle Flights", a chapter of the Experimental Aircraft Association, young flyers may even briefly handle the controls of the aircraft.

Economy

Several businesses operate on airport land which is part of Chehalis' Twin City Town Center district. Economic reports from 2021 and 2022 specify that over 1100 jobs are supported by the airport and the shopping district, with over 500 additional positions of employment that are connected due to the existence of the airfield. The airport receives no annual tax stipend from the state, and is considered "financially self-sustaining", generating $1.2 million in tax revenue to Chehalis and Lewis County and an additional $7.8 million for Washington state.

References

Airports in Washington (state)